The Aboriginal Medical Services Alliance Northern Territory (AMSANT) is a healthcare policy organisation that serves Aboriginal communities in Australia's Northern Territory. It is an independent, not-for-profit group that is funded by Australia's federal government, the Northern Territory Government, charities and non-governmental organisations.

The organisation has offices in Alice Springs and Darwin but provides medical care throughout the entire Northern Territory.

AMSANT was established in October 1994 at a meeting of healthcare services in Central Australia. The following year, the organisation lobbied the Australian Government to transfer funding for Aboriginal healthcare from the Aboriginal and Torres Strait Islander Commission (ATSIC) to the Office for Aboriginal and Torres Strait Islander Health (OATSIH), a division of the Department of Health and Ageing (DoHA).  AMSANT also lobbied the government to increase funding to Aboriginal Comprehensive Primary Health Care in the context of the Northern Territory Emergency Response (the "Intervention").

The group is a member of the Northern Territory Aboriginal Health Forum, an umbrella organisation responsible for health policy for Aboriginal health policy in the Northern Territory and of the National Aboriginal Community Controlled Health Organisation (NACCHO).

Overview
AMSANT supports Aboriginal health services by advocating for the right of local Aboriginal communities to control their own primary health care services and to have those services funded adequately. As a peak body, AMSANT assists its member services through lobbying for improvements in the health status of Aboriginal people, promoting Aboriginal self-determination and community control and representing its member services in meetings and negotiations.

AMSANT works with Aboriginal communities who wish to establish a community-controlled Aboriginal health service, as well as with communities who do not control the existing local health service but wish to have greater input into determining the policies and priorities of their primary health services.

AMSANT’s focus is supporting its members and assisting them to provide high quality comprehensive primary health care services for Aboriginal communities. Primary health care means essential health care based on practical, scientifically sound and socially acceptable methods and technologies which address the main health problems in the community through preventative, curative, rehabilitative and promotional services. It involves the treatment and prevention of disease and injury, and the creation of the circumstances for personal and social well-being.

Structure and members
All of the AMSANT member services attend general meetings which are held at least once every four months.  The general meeting is the main decision-making organ of AMSANT and it has full power to determine what action AMSANT will take on any issue. There is a strong emphasis on consensus decision-making, so it is unusual for issues to come down to a vote.  AMSANT also has a board which is elected from the membership at the annual general meeting.  The board has authority to make decisions for AMSANT between the general meetings.

AMSANT's Chairperson is Marion Scrymgour, who is also the CEO of Wurli Wurlinjang Aboriginal Health Service. The 
Chief Executive Officer is John Paterson.

The community controlled Aboriginal health services that are members of AMSANT are:

 Amoonguna Health Clinic
 Ampilatwatja Health Centre Aboriginal
Anyinginyi Health Aboriginal Corporation
 Balunu Foundation (Balunu)
 Central Australian Aboriginal Alcohol Program Unit (CAAAPU)
 Central Australian Aboriginal Congress (CAAC)
 Council for Aboriginal Alcohol Program Services (CAAPS)
 Danila Dilba Health Service
 Ilpurla Aboriginal Corporation
 Kakadu Health Service
 Katherine West Health Board
 Laynhapuy Homelands Association
 Ltyentye Apurte
 Malabam Health Board
 Marthakal Homeland
 Miwatj Health
 Mutitjulu Health Service
 Ngalkanbuy Health Service
 Pintubi Homelands Health Service
 Sunrise Health Service
 Urapuntja Health Service, Utopia, Northern Territory
 Utju Health Service
 Western Aranda Health Aboriginal Corp (WAHAC)
 Western Desert Nganampa Walytja Palyantjaku Tjutaku Aboriginal Corp (WDNWPT)
 Wurli Wurlinjang Aboriginal Health Service

Activities
AMSANT has a range of programs and projects which all aim to improve the provision of comprehensive primary health care to Aboriginal communities by services controlled by the local community.  They include:

eHealth – AMSANT eHealth unit collaborates with key health care stakeholders to enhance the development and delivery of eHealth solutions.
Research and policy – AMSANT becomes involved in projects as a research partner and also conducts research of its own and assists member services involved in research projects.  AMSANT also develops policies and makes submissions to government on a range of issues relevant to Aboriginal health services.
Health summits – AMSANT occasionally conducts large summits for Aboriginal community members to discuss health issues.  Summits also incorporate service providers and NGO stakeholders.
Public health – AMSANT employs public health medical officers as well as running a public health network and a public health advisory group.
Leadership – AMSANT runs a number of leadership programs for the people who work in community controlled Aboriginal health services.  In addition, a leadership and capacity building program that targets town camp communities is under the auspices of, and supported by, AMSANT.
General practice training and education – facilitating general practice training that takes place in the member services.
Media and advocacy – on behalf of the NT Aboriginal community controlled health care sector.
Workforce support – assisting services and advocating for improved training so that services can find and employ staff they need including doctors, nurses and Aboriginal health workers
Other support for member services – including developing information and communication technology, an online administration manual for Aboriginal medical services, accreditation support, electronic health projects and a continuous quality improvement program.
Year of the Aboriginal Health Worker, 2011 - 2012 - together with the Northern Territory's Senior Aboriginal Health Workers Network, AMSANT is promoting the Year of the Aboriginal Health Worker from 1 July 2011 to 30 June 2012, with events, information, conferences, the Aboriginal Health Worker Awards presentation ceremony and a new Aboriginal Health Worker Hall of Fame.

Vision
AMSANT's vision statement describes what AMSANT is working to achieve:

 Aboriginal community controlled health services in the Northern Territory will be independent and successful organisations, integrated into the NT health system, to provide high quality and effective primary health care services that are responsive to the needs of the community.

Community control
AMSANT membership is only for Aboriginal community controlled health services.  Services that are controlled by government or commercial companies are excluded.  AMSANT believes that community control is essential to providing the best comprehensive primary health care to Aboriginal communities.  All of the health services which are AMSANT members: 
 are incorporated as an independent legal entity;
 have a constitution which guarantees that the control of the body will be by Aboriginal people and that the principle of self-determination will be applied; and 
 have compulsory accountability process which include general meetings open to all members of the local community and that the organisation's management committee are elected by the local Aboriginal community.

Notes

External links
 Official website
 National Aboriginal Community Controlled Health Organisation (NACCHO)

Indigenous health organisations based in Australia
Aboriginal organisations in the Northern Territory